Enterline (Pennsylvania German: Enderlein) is an unincorporated community in Wayne Township, Dauphin County, Pennsylvania, United States, and is a part of the Harrisburg-Carlisle Metropolitan Statistical Area in the United States.

History
Enterline was named for a family of settlers, originally spelled "Enderlein", as is the current Pennsylvania German name.

References

External links 
Enterline Profile

Harrisburg–Carlisle metropolitan statistical area
Unincorporated communities in Dauphin County, Pennsylvania
Unincorporated communities in Pennsylvania